Jwala may refer to:

 Jwala (1969 film), a 1969 Indian Malayalam film
 Jwala (1971 film), a 1971 Bollywood action film 
 Jwala (horse), a British Thoroughbred racehorse

See also